Front Yards in Bloom is a recognition program that celebrates attractive front yards in Edmonton. Front yards are nominated by the general public, local gardeners, and postal workers. Volunteers with the Edmonton Horticultural Society then visit each nominated front yard to deliver their congratulations, post a "Front Yards in Bloom" lawn sign, and evaluate the yard. Awards are given at the annual Edmonton in Bloom Awards event.

Front Yards in Bloom: Winterscapes , which was introduced in 2014, is an extension of the successful summer FYiB program.  This program encourages residents to celebrate winter outdoors and to keep their neighbourhoods looking beautiful year-round through winterscaping in their front yards in Edmonton. Front yard winterscape photo nominations are submitted by general public, neighbours, and postal workers. Photo judge volunteers with the partner groups then evaluate photo nominations. Awards are given at the annual Edmonton in Bloom Awards event.

Front Yards in Bloom (FYiB):

celebrates public gardens and green spaces on private property,
encourages people to beautify their yards,
promotes growing and landscaping, and
fosters community spirit.

This program not a competition because nominations are intended as congratulations from one neighbour to another. Front Yards in Bloom celebrates small pockets of beauty in Edmonton.

Although it's called Front Yards in Bloom, this includes side yards and corner gardens as well; any garden on private property that is open for the community to see (i.e. not fenced-in backyards).

Evaluation and awards

Evaluation is based on curb appeal. Criteria include:

contribution to the community
landscape/winterscape design (such as colour, proportion & scale, diversity, texture & surfaces)
maintenance and horticulture
winterscaping features; and
unique features or highlights.

Summer Program:

Volunteers select top yards from across the city (the "Awards of Merit"). Of those, six finalist yards are evaluated by VIP judges from the program partner groups. All of the top yards are recognized at the Edmonton in Bloom Awards. Awards are also given for the top Natural Front Yards (selected by the Edmonton Native Plant Group), Edible Front Yards (selected by Sustainable Food Edmonton), and Public Spaces (selected by the City of Edmonton's Great Neighbourhoods section).

The Edmonton Journal Readers' Choice Award is given based on the votes of readers for pictures of the top six yards.

Winterscapes Program:

Nominations can be submitted in one of three categories, which include Winter Yard, Winter Art, and Winter Play.  Photo judges narrow down nominations to a group of Finalists.  VIP judges from the program partner groups then select the top two nominations in each category.

Front Yards in Bloom and Community Leagues

The city-wide program has spawned local Front Yards in Bloom programs with Edmonton community leagues. Through these partnerships, participating community leagues help deliver signs and certificates, but they also help to recognize top yards in their own area. Community leagues can also contribute their own criteria, their own categories, and their own recognition ceremonies.

Background and history

Front Yards in Bloom began in 1999 as a partnership program between the Edmonton Horticultural Society, Canada Post, and the City of Edmonton. The formula is modelled from Kitchener and has also run in Winnipeg and other Communities in Bloom cities across Canada.

Connection to Communities in Bloom

Edmonton won the "over 300,000" population category at the national Communities in Bloom awards in 2009. The national judges gave special recognition to the Front Yards in Bloom program contributing to community beauty, community spirit, and connecting with the environment.  Edmonton has participated in the Communities in Bloom (CiB) national program since 1995.

Leduc has also previously won the "20-50,000" population category and Strathcona County won the "international large population" category.
- Top Honours Among Large Municipalities

References

External links
 Edmonton Horticultural Society website 
 CUPW Edmonton Local
 City of Edmonton - Front Yards in Bloom webpage
 City of Edmonton - Front Yards in Bloom: Winterscapes webpage
 Communities in Bloom webpage

Non-profit organizations based in Alberta
Competitions in Canada
Festivals in Edmonton
Gardening in Canada